FC Torpedo NN Nizhny Novgorod was a Russian football team from Nizhny Novgorod that played in the Nizhny Novgorod Oblast championship (6th level).

History
It played professionally from 1936 to 1940, 1945 to 1984 and from 1997 to 2001. FC Volga Nizhny Novgorod is another club that can claim the legacy of the team when it was called FC Volga Gorky. In 1948, 1951, 1954 and 1964 it played in the Soviet Top League, where their best result was 13th place in 1954. Their best result during the late 1990s was the 19th place in the Russian First Division in 1999 (the only season it played on that level, the second highest in Russian football).

Team name history
 1932–1935: FC GAZ Gorky
 1936: Avtozavod im. Molotova Gorky
 1937–1961: FC Torpedo Gorky
 1962: FC Chayka Gorky
 1963–1984: FC Volga Gorky
 1997–2002: FC Torpedo-Viktoriya Nizhny Novgorod
 2003: FC Torpedo NN Nizhny Novgorod

External links
  Team history at KLISF

 
Association football clubs established in 1932
Defunct football clubs in Russia
Sport in Nizhny Novgorod
1932 establishments in Russia
Works association football clubs in Russia